BIGADDA was an Indian e-commerce website owned by Reliance Entertainment, part of the Reliance Anil Dhirubhai Ambani Group. The site was a social network site.

BIGADDA claimed that the top 20 cities account for 45% users from within India while 40% of the users come from Tier III cities like Tuticorin, Bhilai, Amritsar, Guwahati, Surat, Nasik.

Dataquest, a popular IT journal also featured BIGADDA along with sites like IndyaRocks & BharatStudent as one of the top 25 web 2.0 start-ups in India.

Features

Users could upload and share unlimited photos for free, can upload and share music, and can listen to a varied range of songs.

An application platform that was OpenSocial v0.8 compliant was provided. It included some games from Zapak (a partner site) and other applications.

Bigadda closed its operations in 2011 in the face of stiff competition from other social networking sites such as Facebook and Twitter.

See also
 List of social networking websites
 Social network
 Social software
 OpenSocial

References

External links
Official site

Companies based in Mumbai
Indian companies established in 2007
Reliance Group
E-commerce in India
2007 establishments in Maharashtra
Real estate companies established in 2007